In number theory, Maier's theorem  is a theorem about the numbers of primes in short intervals for which Cramér's probabilistic model of primes gives a wrong answer.

The theorem states that if π is the prime-counting function and λ is greater than 1 then

does not have a limit as x tends to infinity; more precisely the limit superior is greater than 1, and the limit inferior is less than 1. The Cramér model of primes predicts incorrectly that it has limit 1 when λ≥2 (using the Borel–Cantelli lemma).

Proofs
Maier proved his theorem using Buchstab's equivalent for the counting function of quasi-primes (set of numbers without prime factors lower to bound ,  fixed). He also used an equivalent of the number of primes in arithmetic progressions of sufficient length due to Gallagher.

 gave another proof, and also showed that most probabilistic models of primes incorrectly predict the mean square error

of one version of the prime number theorem.

See also
Maier's matrix method

References

Theorems in analytic number theory
Probabilistic models
Theorems about prime numbers